Julie Yamamoto is an American politician and retired educator serving as a Republican member of the Idaho House of Representatives from the 10th District.

Early life and education 
Yamamoto was born in Nampa, Idaho. She earned a Bachelor of Arts and Master of Arts from the College of Idaho and a Doctor of Education from the University of Idaho.

Career 
Yamamoto has worked as a teacher and school administrator. She was the chair of the Assistance League of Boise Canyon County Branch.

Elections 
Yamamoto defeated incumbent Jarom Wagoner in the Republican primary with 58.27% of the vote. Yamamoto defeated Democratic nominee Rebecca Yamamoto Hanson with 67.4% of the vote.

References

Year of birth missing (living people)
Living people
People from Nampa, Idaho
College of Idaho alumni
University of Idaho alumni
Republican Party members of the Idaho House of Representatives
Women state legislators in Idaho
American women of Japanese descent in politics
21st-century American women
Asian conservatism in the United States